Izbica may refer to:

Izbica in Lublin Voivodeship (east Poland)
Izhbitza (Hasidic dynasty)
Izbica, Masovian Voivodeship (east-central Poland)
Izbica, Pomeranian Voivodeship (north Poland)
Izbica, Kosovo, a village in the Skenderaj municipality of northern Kosovo
Izbica massacre